Suckling is a surname. Notable people with the surname include:

Catherine Suckling (1725–1767), mother of Horatio Nelson
Charles Suckling (1920–2013), British chemist
Edmund Suckling (1580–1628), Dean of Norwich
Ernest Suckling (1890–1962), English cricketer
George Suckling (18th century), British Virgin Islands lawyer
Isabel Suckling (born 1998), British choral music recording artist
James Suckling (born 1958), American wine critic
John Suckling (poet) (1609–1642), English Cavalier poet
John Suckling (politician) (1569–1627), member of the Privy Council of the United Kingdom
Maurice Suckling (1726–1788), British Navy officer
Matt Suckling (born 1988), Australian rules footballer
Norman Suckling, New Zealand rower
Norman Charles Suckling (1904–1994), English biographer, composer, pianist, and writer on music
Perry Suckling (born 1965), English footballer
Robert Suckling (1520–1589), English Member of Parliament
Sue Suckling, businesswoman and commercial director from New Zealand